The People is the third EP by British band The Music, and the first single on Hut Records to be taken from their debut album. Videos were produced for the title track and "Let Love Be the Healer".

Track listing
"The People" – 4:59
"Let Love Be the Healer" – 3:23
"Life" – 4:08
"Jag Tune" – 4:31

Personnel
The Music
Robert Harvey – vocals
Adam Nutter – guitars
Phil Jordan – drums
Stuart Coleman – bass

Produced and mixed by Jim Abbiss.

Charts

References

2002 EPs
Hut Records EPs
The Music (band) albums
Albums produced by Jim Abbiss